Varuna Shetty is an Indian actress who has done Malayalam- and Tamil-language films. She has been launched by Ranjith Bajpe in his first directional venture Tulu movie, Nirel. Later she worked under Oru Thalai Ragam Shankar in his UAE based thriller Manal Naharam, a bi-lingual. Later she signed Rasam, a Mohanlal film again shot in UAE. Both the movies have been released.

Personal life
Varuna Shetty born in Dubai, and studied at "Our Own Indian High School", Dubai and completed MBA from Manipal University Dubai. She got selected for "Nirel" to play lead role at an audition in Dubai.

Filmography

References

External links

Living people
Mangaloreans
Indian film actresses
Actresses in Tamil cinema
Actresses in Malayalam cinema
Actresses in Tulu cinema
21st-century Indian actresses
Year of birth missing (living people)